Natasha Melnick (born April 10, 1984) is an American television and film actress, best known for her role as Cindy Sanders on the short-lived 1999 NBC comedy drama Freaks and Geeks.

Career
Melnick was born in Los Angeles, California. She graduated from San Fernando High School in the San Fernando Valley, and enrolled in college at age fifteen in the fall of 1999. Her first film appearance was in Disney's The Parent Trap. She also appeared in Go and Orange County, in addition to  recurring roles on Boston Public and Do Over.

Melnick appeared as a reoccurring character in Freaks and Geeks as cheerleader Cindy Sanders, whom central character Sam Weir (John Francis Daley) had a longtime crush on. In 2000, Melnick and the rest of the Freaks and Geeks cast were nominated for the YoungStar Award for Best Ensemble Cast, though the award ultimately went to Malcolm in the Middle. In 2001, appearing in the show Undeclared, developed by Judd Apatow and treated as a spiritual successor to Freaks and Geeks.

, Melnick is a member of the band One Last Run.

Personal life

, Melnick is engaged to Jeff Tucker, the singer and guitar player from the alternative rock band Rock Kills Kid.

Filmography

References

External links

1984 births
Living people
20th-century American actresses
21st-century American actresses
Actresses from Los Angeles
American child actresses
American film actresses
American television actresses
American voice actresses
San Fernando High School alumni